This is a list of flags which have been, or are still today, used in Ireland.

Island of Ireland
The following flags have been used to represent the island of Ireland as a whole, either officially or unofficially.

Northern Ireland

Republic of Ireland

Defence Forces flags

Naval Service

Air Corps

Army

Defence Force Training Centre (DFTC)

Coast Guard

Traditional province flags

City and town flags

Sporting flags

Ensigns

Historical military flags

University flags

Organisations

Political flags

Former national flag proposals

Other former flag proposals

See also

 Cross-border flag for Ireland
 GAA county colours
 List of flags used in Northern Ireland
 Northern Ireland flags issue

References

External links

 Symbols in Northern Ireland – Flags Used in the Region by Dara Mulhern and Martin Melaugh; illustrated article from CAIN Project (Conflict Archive on the INternet)
 National Library of Ireland

Ireland
National symbols of the Republic of Ireland
 
Republic of Ireland-related lists
Ireland-related lists